The Uruguayan Championship 1908 was the eighth official championship of Uruguayan football history.

Overview
The tournament consisted of a two-wheel championship of all against all. It involved ten teams, and the champion was River Plate F.C. for the first time in history. The tournament featured several defections during the course of it.

Teams

League standings 

C.U.R.C.C. left the competition after the tenth match.
Nacional left the competition after the fourteenth match.
Intrépido was reversed after failing to attend four of their first 13 games.
The match C.U.R.C.C. - Nacional was not contested.
Promoted for next season: Colón and Oriental.

References
Uruguay - List of final tables (RSSSF)

Uruguayan Primera División seasons
Uru
1